North Greenfield is an unincorporated community in Logan County, in the U.S. state of Ohio.

History
North Greenfield was platted in 1848. A post office called North Greenfield was established in 1865, and remained in operation until 1904.

References

Unincorporated communities in Logan County, Ohio
1848 establishments in Ohio
Populated places established in 1848
Unincorporated communities in Ohio